Anatoly Kavkayev (1 July 1949 – 31 August 2021) was soviet Greco-Roman wrestler, champion of the USSR and the Europe, medalist of world championship. Started to train in 1964. Took part in seven USSR championships (1971—1977). Won some international tournaments.

Sport results 
 1971 USSR Greco-Roman Wrestling championship - ;
 1972 USSR Greco-Roman Wrestling championship - ;
 1974 USSR Greco-Roman Wrestling championship - ;
 Greco-Roman Wrestling at 1975 Soviet Spartakiad - ;

External links

References

1949 births
2021 deaths
Soviet male sport wrestlers
World Wrestling Championships medalists
European Wrestling Championships medalists